Tea Palić (born April 29, 1991) is a former Croatian alpine skier who competed in slalom and giant slalom.  She competed for Croatia at the 2010 Winter Olympics.  She finished 36th in the giant slalom, her only event at the Olympics.

References

External links
 
 
 

1991 births
Living people
Croatian female alpine skiers
Olympic alpine skiers of Croatia
Alpine skiers at the 2010 Winter Olympics